Achibueno Airport  is an airport  southeast of Linares, in the Maule Region of Chile. The airport was built in 2013.

There is nearby mountainous terrain in all quadrants.

See also

Transport in Chile
List of airports in Chile

References

External links
OpenStreetMap - Achibueno
SkyVector - Linares-Achibueno Airport

Airports in Maule Region